Igor Kislov (born 19 July 1966) is a Ukraine-born former Turkmenistani international footballer, who played as a forward.

He is the first foreign player to become champion of Bulgaria – in 1991 he won the A PFG as part of the Etar Veliko Tarnovo team.

Honours
Etar
Bulgarian League: 1990–91

References

External links

Player Profile at allplayers.in.ua

1966 births
Living people
Soviet footballers
Soviet expatriate footballers
Turkmenistan footballers
Ukrainian footballers
Turkmenistan people of Ukrainian descent
Turkmenistan international footballers
FC Metalurh Kupyansk players
FC Vorskla Poltava players
FC Etar Veliko Tarnovo players
FC Dunav Ruse players
CS Sfaxien players
FC Zirka Kropyvnytskyi players
SC Tavriya Simferopol players
FC Spartak Ivano-Frankivsk players
First Professional Football League (Bulgaria) players
Ukrainian Premier League players
Expatriate footballers in Bulgaria
Expatriate footballers in Tunisia
Footballers at the 1998 Asian Games
Association football forwards
Asian Games competitors for Turkmenistan
Footballers from Donetsk